Helen Christensen  is an Australian mental health researcher with an interest in using the Internet to prevent suicides. She is Director of the Centre for Mental Health Research (CMHR) at the Australian National University and a National Health and Medical Research Council (NHMRC) Senior Principal Research Fellow.  She is the author of over 300 refereed journal articles, seven consumer books and three open access websites. She is also executive director of the Black Dog Institute. Her areas of interest include the evaluation of internet applications/ online programs for the prevention and treatment of mental disorders, the quality of websites, the integration of new technologies into health care, the development of evidence-informed policy and methods to measure impact and dissemination.

She is also a Director of the Australian Foundation for Mental Health Research, and was the chair of the organising committee that established the organisation in 2003. Elected Fellow of the Australian Academy of Health and Medical Sciences in 2015. Christensen was made an Officer of the Order of Australia (AO) in the 2019 Australia Day Honours for "distinguished service to medical research through the development of on-line mental health treatment programs".

References

External links 
 Black Dog Institute
 

Academic staff of the Australian National University
Year of birth missing (living people)
Living people
Fellows of the Academy of the Social Sciences in Australia
Fellows of the Australian Academy of Health and Medical Sciences
Officers of the Order of Australia
21st-century Australian scientists
21st-century Australian women scientists